Finnish composer Einojuhani Rautavaara wrote his Symphony No. 3 in 1959-60. Although employing serial procedures, the harmonies are firmly tonal throughout. In fact, the romantic gestures of the symphony, the majestic use of brass (including Wagner Tubas), as well as the use of German tempo markings, owes much to the symphonies of Anton Bruckner, and the symphony has been termed by critics as neo-Brucknerian in style.

Movements
Langsam, breit, ruhig
Langsam, doch nicht schleppend
Sehr schnell
Bewegt

Analysis

Instrumentation

Premiere

Recordings

Compositions by Einojuhani Rautavaara
1960 compositions
Rautavaara 3